The tropical gnatcatcher (Polioptila plumbea) is a small active insectivorous songbird, which is a resident species throughout a large part of the Neotropics. There are large geographical variations in its voice and plumage, resulting in some populations sometimes being considered separate species, notably the bilineata group as the white-browed gnatcatcher, and the taxon maior as the Marañón gnatcatcher.

Taxonomy
The tropical gnatcatcher was described by the German naturalist Johann Friedrich Gmelin in 1788 and given the binomial name Todus plumbeus. He specified the type locality as Suriname in South America. It is now placed in the genus Polioptila which was introduced by the English zoologist Philip Sclater in 1855.

Description
Its "jizz" is similar to that of other gnatcatchers; a small bird with a relatively long thin bill, a long frequently cocked tail, grey upperparts and whitish underparts. The central rectrices are black, while the outer are white (consequently, the tail appears primarily black from above, white from below), and there is a white patch in the wing (caused by broad white edging to the tertials). Males of the nominate group have a contrasting black cap that reaches just below the eye, while this is lacking in females, which instead have a grey cap (same colour as back). Some females have an irregular black post-ocular patch. This is especially prominent in female of the subspecies atricapilla from north-eastern Brazil.

Males of the white-browed gnatcatcher (bilineata group) resemble males of the nominate group, but the white of their underparts extends clearly above the eye, resulting in a more restricted black cap, which, however, often is connected with a fine black line from the nape to the rear of the eye. Females resemble males, but with the black of the cap replaced by grey, except for an irregular black patch in the post-ocular region (lacking in some females). As the white in both sexes extends above the eye, they appear rather "white-browed" (unlike the nominate group), resulting in the common name proposed for this group if considered a separate species.

The final group, which only includes the taxon maior (the so-called Marañón gnatcatcher), is distinctive. Males resemble males of the nominate group, but, except for their white forecrown, females resemble males of the bilineata group. Juveniles of all groups resemble females.

The tropical gnatcatcher has a thin buzzy gezzz call and a trilled swee see see si si si su su song. However, exact structure and tone of the voice varies greatly over its range.

Distribution and ecology
The nominate group if found from north-eastern Brazil (the Caatinga region), west through the Amazon Basin, and north to the Guianas, northern Venezuela and northern Colombia (including the valleys of Magdalena and Cauca). The bilineata group is found from north-western Peru, through the Chocó and Central America, to southern Mexico. The Marañón gnatcatcher is restricted to the Marañón valley in northern Peru.

Both the nominate and the bilineata group are found in a wide range of wooded habitats, ranging from the arid woodland and scrub (such as the Caatinga in Brazil) to humid forest (such as the various types of humid forest in the Amazon).

In dense humid forest, it is typically found at canopy height, but it is commonly seen at lower levels in more open habitats. The tropical gnatcatcher gleans spiders and their eggs, beetles, caterpillars and other insects from outer twigs and foliage. Moving about alone or in pairs, it often joins mixed-species feeding flocks with tanagers, New World warblers and honeycreepers.

The female lays two or three brown-spotted white eggs in May and June.

This is a curious bird and unafraid of humans; this behavior renders it vulnerable to predators, however. Even omnivorous mammals as small as the common marmoset (Callithrix jacchus) will eagerly plunder tropical gnatcatcher nests in the undergrowth – perhaps more often during the dry season when fruits are scarce – despite the birds' attempts to defend their offspring.

Conservation status
In general, this species is common and widespread throughout most of its range. Consequently, it is considered to be of least concern by BirdLife International and IUCN. In the Amazon, this species is primarily associated with relatively open habitats (e.g. Várzea Forest), resulting in it being rather local. It may benefit from the opening of the forest caused by deforestation, at least as long as some stands of trees remain. The Marañón gnatcatcher remains common, but is restricted to a small region with extensive habitat destruction. Three other taxa with highly restricted distributions may be threatened, these being anteocularis of the Magdalena Valley (Colombia), daguae of the Cauca Valley (Colombia), and cinericia of Coiba Island (Panama).

References

Further reading

External links

 
 
 
 

tropical gnatcatcher
Birds of Mexico
Birds of Central America
Birds of Belize
Birds of Costa Rica
Birds of Panama
Birds of Colombia
Birds of Ecuador
Birds of Peru
Birds of Brazil
Birds of the Guianas
Birds of Venezuela
Birds of the Amazon Basin
Birds of the Caatinga
tropical gnatcatcher
tropical gnatcatcher